Zygeupolia rufa is a species of ribbon worm within the family Lineidae. Its distribution is in the English Channel in benthic environments. Individuals can reach up to 5000 millimeters in length.

References 

Animals described in 1901
Lineidae
Fauna of the Atlantic Ocean